The Women's individual compound open archery discipline at the 2016 Summer Paralympics was contested  from September 10 to September 16. Ranking rounds took place on 10 September, while single elimination knockout rounds continued on September 16.

In the ranking rounds each archer shot 72 arrows, and was seeded according to score. In the knock-out stages each archer shot three arrows in each of five sets against an opponent, and scores were aggregated. Matches were won by the higher aggregate scorer. Losing semifinalists competed in a bronze medal match.

Ranking Round
PR = Paralympic Record.

Knockout stage

Final four

Section 1

Section 2

References

Women's individual compound open
Para